Playmakers is an American drama television series created by John Eisendrath that aired on ESPN from August 26 to November 11, 2003. It depicts the lives of the Cougars, a fictional professional football team in an unidentified city. The show stars Omar Gooding, Marcello Thedford, Christopher Wiehl, Jason Matthew Smith, Russell Hornsby, and Tony Denison. The show, which ran eleven episodes, was the first original drama series created by ESPN. Although the ratings were very high for ESPN—Playmakers was the highest-rated show on the network other than its Sunday night NFL and Saturday college football games—ESPN eventually canceled the series under pressure from the National Football League, who disliked the portrayal of the negative aspects of its players' lives off the field.

Style
The show follows the lives of various members of an ensemble cast who portray the players and personnel on a fictional American football team, the Cougars, in a fictional league (referred to in the series as "The League") during the regular season.

Many of these segments are prefaced by an internal monologue in the format of a character narrating in his head.

Cast and characters

Main
 Omar Gooding as Demetrius Harris, #39 - A rookie running back from Colorado.
 Marcello Thedford as Kelvin "The Buffalo" James, #60 - A fourth year offensive tackle from Oklahoma State.
 Christopher Wiehl as Derek McConnell, #11 - A fourth year quarterback from Louisville.
 Jason Matthew Smith as Eric Olczyk, #54 - A fifth year middle linebacker from Penn State.
 Russell Hornsby as Leon Taylor, #33 - A ninth year running back from USC.
 Anthony John Denison as Coach Mike George - The head coach in his ninth season with the team.

Recurring
 Stephen Bogaert - Phil Chambers, Team Equipment Manager 
 Bruce Gray - Gene Wilbanks, the team's owner
 Phillip Jarrett - Coach Rudman, Defensive Coordinator and close friend of Coach George 
 Karen LeBlanc - Robin Taylor, Leon's wife
 Thea Andrews - Samantha Lovett, reporter who presumably shows a love interest for Leon Taylor. 
 Dan Petronijevic - Thad Guerwicz, a wide receiver who is a closeted gay man
 Kevin Jubinville - Dr. Gatewood, The team Physician 
 Sasha Roiz - Stephen Lyles, Assistant Head Coach and Offensive Coordinator 
 Gabriel Hogan - Guard Dog Fredericks 
 Tacquira LaTouche - Herself 
 Frank Chiesurin - David, Guerwictz's boyfriend
 Laura Jordan - August, Guerwictz's girlfriend and later fiancé to publicly cover up his homosexuality 
 K. C. Collins - Ron Martin, a rookie Wide Receiver for the Cougars.

Roster

Episodes

DVD
The only season of Playmakers was released on DVD by ESPN Home Video in 2004.

Awards
 Won AFI TV Award, Top TV Series (2003)
 Won GLAAD Media Award, Outstanding Drama Series (2004)
 Nominated CSC Award, Best Cinematography in TV Series (2004)
 Nominated DGC Craft Award, Outstanding Achievement in Sound Editing - Television Series (2004)

References

External links
 
 

ESPN original programming
2000s American drama television series
2003 American television series debuts
2003 American television series endings
American football television series
English-language television shows
2000s American LGBT-related drama television series
Television series by ABC Studios
Television series created by John Eisendrath